Diaporthe litchicola is a plant endophyte and occasionally a plant pathogen, first found on Litchi chinensis in Australia.

References

Further reading
Radiastuti, Nani, et al. "Alkaloid profile of endophytic Diaporthe spp. from Cinchona calisaya." Jurnal Penelitian Teh dan Kina 18.1 (2016).
Fan, Xin-Lei, et al. "Diaporthe rostrata, a novel ascomycete from Juglans mandshurica associated with walnut dieback." Mycological Progress 14.10 (2015): 1–8.
Gopal, K., et al. "Citrus Melanose (Diaporthe citri Wolf): A Review." Int. J. Curr. Microbiol. App. Sci 3.4 (2014): 113–124.

External links
MycoBank

Fungal plant pathogens and diseases
litchicola